Dalil Boubakeur (born 2 November 1940) is a physician, Mufti, and current rector of the Great Mosque of Paris. He is also the president of the French Council of the Muslim Faith. He was born on 2 November 1940 in the Algerian city of Skikda, to Hamza Boubakeur and Hafza Leshtoilette. He studied at Lycées Bugeaud in Algiers, before moving to France and studying at Lycée Louis-le-Grand. He graduated from the Faculty of Sciences et Medicine of Paris and holds degrees in Quranic studies, theology and Muslim civilization.

External links

 Docteur Dalil Boubakeur , official biography on the site of the Great Mosque of Paris
 Dalil Boubakeur, biography on the site of the Berkley Center for Religion, Peace, and World Affairs

1940 births
Living people
Lycée Louis-le-Grand alumni
Officiers of the Légion d'honneur
Algerian emigrants to France
People from Skikda
Algerian Muslims
French Muslims